Chiranellur  is a village in Thrissur district in the state of Kerala, India.

Demographics
 India census, Chiranellur had a population of 8866 with 4232 males and 4634 females.

References

Villages in Thrissur district